Charlotte Ritchie (born 29 August 1989) is an English actress and singer. She is best known for her roles as Alison in Ghosts, Oregon in Channel 4 comedy Fresh Meat, Hannah in Siblings, Alison in Dead Pixels, Barbara Gilbert in BBC drama Call the Midwife, George in Feel Good, and Kate Galvin in You. She was a member of the classical crossover group All Angels.

Early life
Charlotte Ritchie was born in  Clapham, London, on 29 August 1989. She was educated at James Allen's Girls' School in Dulwich, and joined Youth Music Theatre UK and its production of Red Hunter in 2005. She gained a degree in English and drama at the University of Bristol while filming Fresh Meat.

Career
In 2004, Ritchie played a lead role in a short film entitled The Open Doors with Michael Sheen. She appeared as an uncredited extra in the 2005 film, Harry Potter and the Goblet of Fire. She also featured in The Pierglass at the Young Pleasance Theatre in August 2006 at the Edinburgh Festival Fringe.

Ritchie performed with All Angels in an episode of Emmerdale. She also played Emily Owen, a neighbour in the BBC's Life of Riley.

From 2011 to 2016, Ritchie portrayed Oregon in the Channel 4 comedy series Fresh Meat.

She stars alongside Tom Stourton in the BBC Three sitcom Siblings, which was first broadcast in summer 2014, and she appeared as a guest panellist in the same year on 8 Out of 10 Cats.

In 2015, Ritchie joined the cast of popular period drama Call The Midwife. She played Nurse Barbara Gilbert (Hereward) until March 2018, when she decided to leave the show.

In 2016, she appeared in the UK production of Noël Coward's Private Lives, playing the role of Sibyl Chase.

On New Years Day 2019, she had the guest starring role of Lin in the Doctor Who episode "Resolution".

Since 2019, she has played Alison in Ghosts, a BBC sitcom about a young couple who inherits a haunted estate, and has also played Alison in Dead Pixels. She additionally played George in the Channel 4 series Feel Good, co-starring with Mae Martin. The series released on Netflix in 2020.

Ritchie was a contestant on series 11 of Taskmaster, which was broadcast on Channel 4 in March to May 2021.

In 2022, Ritchie joined the cast as a series regular on season 4 of You.

Filmography

Film

Television

Video games

References

External links
 
 

Living people
Actresses from London
Alumni of the University of Bristol
English women singers
English film actresses
English television actresses
People educated at James Allen's Girls' School
Singers from London
Alumni of British Youth Music Theatre
21st-century English women singers
21st-century English singers
All Angels members
1989 births